Leigh Miller is the name of:

 Leigh Miller (sprinter) (born 1905), Canadian sprinter
 Leigh Miller (hurdler) (born 1963), Australian hurdler

See also

 Lee Miller (disambiguation)